The Lawrence Arms are an American punk rock band from Chicago, formed in 1999. They have released seven full-length albums and toured extensively.

Band history

Pre-history
Prior to forming the Lawrence Arms, the three band members were active in other Chicago-area bands. Brendan Kelly had played in the ska punk band Slapstick. Chris McCaughan had played in Tricky Dick before joining Kelly in the punk band The Broadways. McCaughan and Kelly also shared an apartment together on Chicago's north side. Neil Hennessy, meanwhile, had played in a band called Baxter. Both Slapstick and The Broadways released albums on Asian Man Records, a small record label based in Monte Sereno, California that would later release albums by The Lawrence Arms.

Formation and Asian Man years
The three musicians came together to form the Lawrence Arms in 1999, taking their name from the apartment complex in which Kelly and McCaughan had lived before being evicted in the middle of the night. Although punk rock bands in their infancy generally start out by releasing EPs and 7" vinyl singles, the band members used their existing relationship with Asian Man Records to immediately begin recording a full-length album, A Guided Tour of Chicago, which was released later that year and before the band had even played a single show. A second album, Ghost Stories, followed in 2000. Both albums focused heavily on the members' own stories of growing up and living in Chicago.

The band's next two releases were split EPs with other bands. The first, a split with Shady View Terrace, was released in 2000 and was their first release to be recorded by Matt Allison, who would continue to record and produce all of their subsequent releases. A second EP, Present Day Memories, was released in 2001 and was a split with The Chinkees.

Signing to Fat Wreck Chords
The band's split with The Chinkees had brought them to the attention of Fat Mike of NOFX, who signed them to his Fat Wreck Chords label in late 2001. Their first release on the label was a 7" vinyl single, part of the label's "Fat Club" series of 7" records. This was followed by the full-length album Apathy and Exhaustion, released in 2002. The album spawned the band's second music video, for the song "Porno and Snuff Films," and they toured extensively with NOFX and other bands from the Fat label.

Their next album was 2003's The Greatest Story Ever Told. Their most ambitious album to date, it demonstrated the band members' continued growth as musicians and songwriters and included extensive footnotes to the lyrics detailing their many references to history, literature, and pop culture. It also showed an evolution in the band's vocal style. Kelly had sung most of the vocals on their first album, while on subsequent releases he and McCaughan had split vocal duties almost equally from one song to the next, with Kelly's voice tending to sound more harsh and urgent while McCaughan's sounds more relaxed and melodic. With this release, however, the two began to move towards more of a duet style of singing which would feature prominently on their next album. Extensive touring following the album's release saw the band on the road for much of 2003 and 2004. They also contributed a song to the Fat Wreck Chords Rock Against Bush, Vol. 2 compilation, leading up to the 2004 presidential election and became involved with the Punk Voter campaign.

The Lawrence Arms also played a portion of the 2004 Warped Tour, but the band's attitude towards the tour resulted in controversy. In a 2006 interview, Kelly claimed that the band "did like seven days of it and we got kicked off it, banned for life" for "pointing out the obvious flaws of the Warped Tour, on stage while the people running the Warped Tour were watching us." When asked his opinion of the tour, Kelly responded:

Warped Tour, it’s destroying the economy of DIY; and it’s doing it very methodically and very successfully in that [the] summer touring season used to involve a bunch of bands, like Alkaline Trio for example, jumping on buses and taking smaller bands, like us and The Black Maria for example, on tour. There would be all these bands that would do that, so all these support bands would have great tours to go on. Kids in every town would have a bunch of different shows to go see, like over the summer. Small clubs would have big, good shows at least once a week if not twice a week, three times a week; and kids would have stuff to do. Now, all those big bands go on the Warped Tour. When they come to town, it’s for one day. It’s in a band shell, small clubs all across the US are closing down, they can’t afford to be open. Bands like us have to tour against the Warped Tour, which sucks; or tour on the Warped Tour, which sucks even more.

He further likened the experience of Warped Tour to "going to a band shell and buying twelve dollar bottles of water and standing there watching your favorite band play from like a million feet away." He also criticized the tour's effect on punk rock and independent music as a whole: "Now people talk about the Warped Tour like it's the greatest thing to ever happen to punk rock, it's not the greatest thing to ever happen to punk rock - it's single handedly dismantling the whole thing we've been fucking building for all this time and nobody gives a fuck...And that's why it's the worst thing to ever happen to punk rock, or DIY music in general." Their next album, 2006's Oh! Calcutta!, included a hidden track entitled "Warped Summer Extravaganza (Major Excellent)" referencing their attitude towards the tour.

The Falcon, Sundowner, and Oh! Calcutta!
In December 2004 Kelly and Hennessy joined with fellow Chicago natives Dan Andriano of the Alkaline Trio (who had played with Kelly in Slapstick) and Todd Mohney, formerly of Rise Against, to form another band called The Falcon, and released an EP on Red Scare Industries. Meanwhile, Asian Man Records released a Lawrence Arms compilation album titled Cocktails & Dreams including tracks from out-of-print split releases along with other rarities, b-sides, and re-recordings.

The Lawrence Arms re-entered the studio in October and November 2005 and recorded the album Oh! Calcutta!, which was released on Fat Wreck Chords in March 2006. The album was noted as faster and more energetic than the band's prior releases, with Kelly and McCaughan sharing lead vocals on every track. A music video was released for "The Devil's Takin' Names" from the album.

In March 2007, McCaughan released the debut album Four One Five Two from his acoustic side-project Sundowner, featuring two Lawrence Arms covers, one of which, "Boatless Booze Cruise" was originally sung by Kelly. The Lawrence Arms toured again in the fall of 2007, with their side projects The Falcon and Sundowner as openers along with the recently reunited American Steel. McCaughan also toured as Sundowner in the mainly acoustic/folk Revival Tour featuring Chuck Ragan of Hot Water Music, Ben Nichols of Lucero, and Tim Barry. Hennessy also joined fellow Chicagoans Smoking Popes on drums, touring and releasing music with them.

Recent activity
In June 2009, The Lawrence Arms recorded a studio EP. Titled Buttsweat and Tears, it was released on October 27 of that year through Fat Wreck Chords both as a 7" EP and as a digital download with an extra song. They then went on a tenth anniversary performance in October at the Metro Chicago, followed by a seven-date headlining tour of Arizona and California in November with Teenage Bottlerocket and Cobra Skulls as support.

The band’s 10th-anniversary performance at The Metro in their hometown of Chicago was recorded and slated for a release on DVD by Crankstrap Productions. However, complications that might have included logistics at Crankstrap, and/or might have included the band’s being audited by the IRS, meant that the DVD was consigned to purgatory until 2012, when Fat Wreck Chords announced that it would finally be released on June 5 by them in collaboration with Crankstrap, a partnership previously announced in April 2011.

The Lawrence Arms recently signed with Epitaph Records and released their sixth studio album, Metropole on January 28, 2014, along with the News From Yalta 7".

On May 27, 2020, the band released "PTA", the lead single from their first album in six years and seventh overall studio album, Skeleton Coast, which was released on July 17 via Epitaph Records.

Band members
Chris McCaughan - guitar, vocals
Brendan Kelly - bass, vocals
Neil Hennessy - drums

Discography

The discography of The Lawrence Arms consists of seven studio albums, one compilation album, five EPs, and three music videos.

Studio albums

Compilation albums

Extended plays

Music videos

Other appearances
The following Lawrence Arms songs were released on compilation albums and as music downloads. This is not an exhaustive list; songs that were first released on the band's albums and EPs are not included.

I Denotes songs that were re-released on Cocktails & Dreams.

References

External links

The Lawrence Arms official MySpace profile
Fat Wreck Chords
Asian Man Records
Red Scare Records

Fat Wreck Chords artists
Asian Man Records artists
Epitaph Records artists
Musical groups from Chicago
American musical trios
Musical groups established in 1999
Punk rock groups from Illinois
Musical groups from Illinois
1999 establishments in Illinois